is a city located in Hyōgo Prefecture, Japan. , the city had an estimated population of 42,494 in 18242 households and a population density of 72 persons per km².

Geography 
Kasai is located almost in the center of the Harima Plain, with forests in the north and low mountains in the south. The city measures approximately 12.4 kilometers east-west, and 19.8 kilometers north-south. The main rivers that flow here are the Manganji River, which is one of the tributaries of the Kako River, and the Fukkoji River, which is a tributary of the Manganji River.

Neighbouring municipalities 
Hyōgo Prefecture
 Himeji
 Kakogawa
 Ono
 Nishiwaki
 Katō
 Taka
 Ichikawa
 Fukusaki

Climate
Kasai has a Humid subtropical climate (Köppen Cfa) characterized by warm summers and cool winters with light to no snowfall.  The average annual temperature in Kasai is 14.9 °C. The average annual rainfall is 1606 mm with September as the wettest month. The temperatures are highest on average in August, at around 26.8 °C, and lowest in January, at around 3.5 °C.

Demographics
Per Japanese census data, the population of Kasai has remained relatively steady over the past 70 years.

History
The area of the modern city of Kasai was within ancient Harima Province.  In the Edo Period, it was mostly tenryō territory administered directly by the Tokugawa shogunate with a small portion of the area under the control of Himeji Domain. The village of Hōjō was established within Kasai District with the creation of the modern municipalities system on April 1, 1889.  Hōjō was elevated to town status on January 15, 1955. On April 1, 1967 Hōjō merged with the neighboring towns of Izumi and Kasai to form the city of Kasai.

Government
Kasai has a mayor-council form of government with a directly elected mayor and a unicameral city council of 15 members. Kasai contributes one member to the Hyogo Prefectural Assembly. In terms of national politics, the city is part of Hyōgo 4th district of the lower house of the Diet of Japan.

Economy
The economy of Kasai is centered around agriculture.

Education
Kasai has 11 public elementary schools and four public middle schools operated by the city government and two public high school operated by the Hyōgo Prefectural Department of Education. The prefecture also operates one special education school for the handicapped.

Transportation

Railway
 Hōjō Railway Company – Hōjō Line
  -  -  -  -  -  -

Highway
  Chūgoku Expressway

Public Transport
Kasai is highly dependent on private vehicles as the main form of transportation. Public transport is an inter-prefecture highway bus, inter-city bus (Shinki bus), KIX airport limousine bus (Hakuro bus), domestic-bus (Kasai city community bus, Happy bus) and Taxi.

Sister city relations
 -  Pullman, Washington USA.

Local attractions
Ichijō-ji,  the temple's pagoda, completed in 1171, is a National Treasure of Japan
Rakan-ji, famous for its Gohyaku-Rakan statues (the 500 disciples of Buddha)
Hyōgo Prefectural Flower Center
Tamaoka Kofun Cluster, National Historic Site
Maruyama Park, where one can find the world's largest globe clock (Guinness certified) and reputedly the world's longest roller slide

Noted people from Kasai
Kiichi Inoue, politician
Shiro Miya, musician

References

External links

 Kasai City official website 
 

Cities in Hyōgo Prefecture
Kasai, Hyōgo